Morafeno is a town and commune in Madagascar. It belongs to the district of Maevatanana, which is a part of Betsiboka Region. The population of the commune was estimated to be approximately 3,000 in 2001 commune census.

Only primary schooling is available. The majority 75% of the population of the commune are farmers, while an additional 20% receives their livelihood from raising livestock. The most important crop is rice, while other important products are peanuts and cassava.  Services provide employment for 5% of the population.

References and notes 

Populated places in Betsiboka